Linda Mazri (born 21 December 2001) is an Algerian badminton player. She is the gold medalist in African Games and African Championships.

Career 
Mazri started representing Algeria at an early age of 13 and competed for the first time with the national team in the Serbian Under-15 International Championship, and at that time won two bronze medals in the singles and women's doubles competitions. Mazri also represented her country in the African Under-15 Championship hosted by Egypt and won the bronze medal in the singles category and the silver in the mixed doubles. After that, she participated in the South African International Championships and won the singles bronze and the girls' doubles gold, and in the Uganda International Championship she won the singles gold and the singles bronze as well as won many medals and titles at the level of singles, doubles and mixed doubles in the Arab championships. Mazri shined in the World Open Championship that was held in Algeria in 2017 when she won the gold of mixed doubles and the bronze of the girls' doubles, and in the following year, in the African Games, she won the gold of mixed doubles, and she repeated the same thing in the African Championship held in Nigeria 2019 by winning gold in Mixed doubles, bronze in Women's doubles event and qualified for the World Championships in China in 2018.

Achievements

African Games 
Mixed doubles

African Championships 
Women's doubles

Mixed doubles

African Youth Games 
Girls' singles

Girls' doubles

African Junior Championships 
Girls' singles

Girls' doubles

Mixed doubles

BWF International 
Women's singles

Women's doubles

Mixed doubles

  BWF International Challenge tournament
  BWF International Series tournament
  BWF Future Series tournament

BWF Junior International 
Girls' singles

Girls' doubles

Mixed doubles

  BWF Junior International Grand Prix tournament
  BWF Junior International Challenge tournament
  BWF Junior International Series tournament
  BWF Junior Future Series tournament

References 

2001 births
Living people
Algerian female badminton players
Competitors at the 2019 African Games
African Games gold medalists for Algeria
African Games silver medalists for Algeria
African Games medalists in badminton
Competitors at the 2022 Mediterranean Games
Mediterranean Games competitors for Algeria
21st-century Algerian people